The 34th Biathlon World Championships were held in 1999 in Kontiolahti, Finland. Due to the cold, the individual and the mass start events were moved to Oslo, Norway. The mass start was contested for the first time in the world championships.

Medal winners

Men

Women

Medal table

References

1999
Biathlon World Championships
1999 in Norwegian sport
International sports competitions in Oslo
International sports competitions hosted by Finland
1999 in Finnish sport
Kontiolahti
Biathlon competitions in Finland
Biathlon competitions in Norway
1990s in Oslo
Holmenkollen
February 1999 sports events in Europe